The band Modern Times, consisting of Simone Weis and Jimmy Martin, was the last participants for Luxembourg in the Eurovision Song Contest performing the song "Donne-moi une chance" in the 1993 contest . The song finished in 20th place with 11 points. This was to be the last entry for the Grand Duchy for the foreseeable future. The band were Luxembourg nationals and were the last of 9 acts to have sung for their country in 37 attempts. They were backed on stage by Patrick Alessi who had provided backing vocals previously at the 1983 Eurovision Song Contest for Luxembourg and was also in the 1996 Belgian national final

Eurovision Song Contest entrants for Luxembourg
Eurovision Song Contest entrants of 1993